A cognitive intervention is a form of psychological intervention, a  technique and therapy practised in counselling. It describes a myriad of approaches to therapy that focus on addressing psychological distress at a cognitive level. It is also associated with cognitive therapy, which focuses on the thought process and the manner by which emotions have bearing on the cognitive processes and structures. The cognitive intervention forces behavioral change. Counselors adopt different technique level to suit the characteristic of the client. For instance, when counseling adolescents, a more advanced strategy is adopted than the intervention used in children. Before the intervention, an initial cognitive assessment is also conducted to cover the concerns of the cognitive approach, which cover the whole range of human expression - thought, feeling, behavior, and environmental triggers.

The various types of cognitive interventions are practiced in cognitive psychology.

Description 

Cognitive intervention focuses on addressing and changing beliefs and attitudes as well as improving cognition. Notably, a common domain of interventions is the inspection of past experiences that led to formations of certain beliefs and attitudes. Retrospection is most often used to change how past events/experiences are perceived by the individual. The purpose of addressing past experiences is to address the root of the psychological distress and, by doing so, redirect thoughts and relieve distress. Another common domain is mental stimulation to avoid the decay of neural pathways. This generally focuses on creating new neural pathways and/or stimulating existing pathways. Cognitive interventions assume that thought processes can, to some extent, be controlled and changed by the individual. Generally, all cognitive interventions focus on exercising the mind to think differently.

Background

One of the earliest uses of cognitive interventions was by Aaron T. Beck and colleagues. Beck's "cognitive theory of depression" focused on addressing beliefs that a person holds that makes them being more susceptible to depression. Part of Beck's cognitive theory focused on the cognitive triad to model belief systems. These beliefs can be about themselves, others, or the world around them. For instance, one harmful belief is never being good enough which can lead to self-deprecation and lead to increased vulnerability to depression. Beck developed cognitive therapies to address and change these beliefs in order to help manage depression. Cognitive therapy consists of a series of sessions that aim to provide depressed patients with "cognitive and behavioural skills" to cope with depression.

Beck's cognitive therapy was further developed for clinical uses to address a broad spectrum of mental illnesses. Beck's cognitive theory of depression was extended to address general anxiety disorder, personality disorders and more. Cognitive therapies developed to address mental disorders focused on changing maladaptive beliefs that modify people's perception of self and well as experience of their environment. 

Modern use of cognitive interventions has extended beyond addressing beliefs to treating a broad range of psychological problems at a cognitive level.

Applications

Cognitive interventions are applied in both clinical and non-clinical settings. The cognitive intervention strategy differs depending on the application but follows the same general framework. The strategies used depend on the target of the intervention.

Dementia

Cognitive interventions are a non-pharmacological/psychological method of approaching dementia as well as mild cognitive impairment. The three approaches to cognitive interventions for dementia were developed in 2003 by Clare and colleagues. The three approaches were created for the purpose of using cognitive interventions to address Alzheimer's disease (AD), and it has been widely used to address AD and different forms of dementia. They defined a conceptual framework that categorised three approaches to cognitive interventions. The three approaches have different purposes and underlying assumptions. 

 Cognitive stimulation
 Cognitive stimulation aims to enhance "cognitive and social functioning". Its main goal is global cognitive stimulation. It assumes that cognitive functions operate simultaneously and therefore cognitive interventions should employ a global method of cognitive stimulation. Cognitive stimulation involves activities to improve cognition in social settings, such as discussions.
 Cognitive training
 Cognitive training is done through "guided practice on a set of standard tasks". These standard tasks are aimed to challenge and improve specific cognitive functions (such as memory). In essence, it uses the repetition of standardised tasks to train the mind to perform certain cognitive functions. It assumes that, through "routine practice" of specific functions, these functions can be improved or at least maintained. Cognitive training can happen in many forms depending on the circumstances of the individual and can vary in difficulty; it can be administered by a therapist, done in a social setting, guided by a caregiver etc. In brief, it focuses on improving specific cognitive functions through repeated practice of standardised tasks.
 Cognitive rehabilitation
The aim of cognitive rehabilitation is to help people "achieve or maintain an optimal level of physical, psychological and social functioning" given their specific conditions. Cognitive rehabilitation recognises that cognitive impairment causes reverberating consequences of all aspects of people's life and aims to minimise the consequences felt. By rehabilitating people to social, physical, and psychological contexts, cognitive rehabilitation aims to help people resume a constructive lifestyle to the best of their ability. Cognitive rehabilitation is individualised to the needs of each individual and changes as the individual's condition evolves.

Memory Performance and Memory Self-Efficacy

There is a general pattern of cognitive decline as people age, and one notable aspect of decline is memory. Specifically, memory performance declines in the older adult population as well as their memory self-efficacy. In other words, older adults have decreasing memory functions as well as a loss of confidence in their abilities to "use memory effectively". However, due to adult neurogenesis, people are capable of enhancing their cognitive abilities throughout their life. Thus numerous cognitive interventions models were developed to improve memory performance and increase memory self-efficacy. These models have been tested for their significance in improving cognitive functioning. Some notable models are:

 Adult Development and Enrichment Project (ADEPT)
 the ADEPT model improves cognitive capabilities through “fluid ability training”. Fluid intelligence generally declines as people age, through training, ADEPT aims to slow the decline and improve cognitive ability. By improving fluid cognitive abilities, ADEPT can potentially improve memory functioning.
 Advanced Cognitive Training for Independent and Vital Elderly (ACTIVE)
 ACTIVE uses cognitive training to intellectually stimulate older adults. It aims to protect cognitive functioning of older adults, including memory performance, in the ageing process. To test its effectiveness,  the largest randomized clinical trial to test cognitive training was done in the US. The results from the trial found that ACTIVE has a significant effect on improving “targeted cognitive abilities”.

Mild Cognitive Impairment

Cognition-based interventions for healthy older people and people with mild cognitive impairment 
Current evidence suggests that cognition-based interventions do improve mental performance (i.e. memory, executive function, attention, and speed) in older adults and people with mild cognitive impairment. Especially, immediate and delayed verbal recall resulted in higher performance gains from memory training.

Criticism

The use of cognitive interventions to address mental disorders is controversial and have had mixed results. Cognitive intervention programs have shown to be ineffective to treat certain conditions and therefore puts in the question the scope of applications for cognitive interventions.

 Progression to Alzheimer's Disease
 A literature review done of the use of cognitive intervention programs to "slow progression to AD in healthy elderly" concluded that cognitive interventions are ineffective as a preventative measure for AD. 
 Early stages of AD and vascular dementia
 Cognitive training and cognitive dementia are cognitive intervention programmes used to address memory difficulties of these cognitive impairments; however, Clare and colleagues examined six studies that used cognitive intervention and found no statistically significant effect of these interventions on memory functioning.

See also 
 Brain training

References 

Cognitive therapy